Fabrice Pauline (born December 5, 1982) is a Mauritian football player who currently plays for Curepipe Starlight SC in the Mauritian Premier League and for the Mauritius national football team as a midfielder. He is featured on the Mauritian national team in the official 2010 FIFA World Cup video game.

References 

1982 births
Living people
Mauritius international footballers
Mauritian footballers
Curepipe Starlight SC players
Mauritian Premier League players
Association football midfielders